Soviet republics,U.S. states, and Prefectures of Japan have their own articles in Anthems of the Soviet Republics,List of U.S. state songs, and List of prefecture songs of Japan respectively.

This is a list of regional anthems, that is those of non-sovereign states, regions and dependent territories.

List

See also 

 List of historical national anthems
 List of national anthems
 List of U.S. state songs
 Anthems of the autonomous communities of Spain
 List of Indian state songs
 List of anthems of Venezuela
 Anthems of the Soviet Republics
 National anthem
 Royal anthem

Notes

References 

Non-sovereign
List
 
Regional